Ica may refer to:

Ica River, a river in Peru which flows through Ica city
Ica, a city in Peru in Ica district
Ica District, a district in Ica province
Ica Province, a province in Ica region
Ica Region, a region (formerly called a "department") in Peru